The 1945–46 Idaho Vandals men's basketball team represented the University of Idaho during the 1945–46 NCAA college basketball season. Members of the Pacific Coast Conference, the Vandals were led by fourth-year acting head coach James "Babe" Brown and played their home games on campus at Memorial Gymnasium in Moscow, Idaho.

In the last game of the regular season, the Vandals defeated Palouse neighbor Washington State by two points in Moscow, and Oregon took down runner-up Oregon State by a point in overtime on the road in Corvallis.
In the four-game series with each, the Vandals split with both Oregon and Oregon State, took three from Washington, and swept Washington State.

Idaho met Southern Division champion  in the best-of-three championship series in Berkeley, lost game one in a near-riot, won  but lost

Postseason results

|-
!colspan=5 style=| Pacific Coast Conference Playoff Series

Fatal accident
Earlier in the season on December 21, player Ronnie White (age 21) and student manager Walter Thomas (age 18) were killed in a midday automobile accident in southern Idaho, near Wendell. Also injured were players Warren Shepherd, George Weitz, and Bob Fuller, the latter two hospitalized. The five were traveling in a panel truck driven by Thomas from Rupert to Boise when it collided head-on with a larger truck loaded with concrete pipe on a snow-covered curve; the other driver was 

The team's outstanding player award was named for White, who previously played for Lewiston High School and North Idaho Teachers College (NITC) in Lewiston.

Aftermath
Alumnus Guy Wicks returned to the university after serving in the U.S. Navy during World War II and resumed his duties as head coach in basketball (and baseball); Brown was the acting athletic director during the war and also the head football coach in 1945 and 1946.

The next title in basketball for Idaho was 35 years away, in 1981 in the Big Sky Conference.

References

External links
Sports Reference – Idaho Vandals: 1945–46 basketball season
Gem of the Mountains: 1946 University of Idaho yearbook – 1945–46 basketball season
Idaho Argonaut – student newspaper – 1946 editions

Idaho Vandals men's basketball seasons
Idaho
Idaho
Idaho